La Mosquitia is a Spanish name for:

Mosquito Coast, a region on the Caribbean coast of Central America, presently divided into:
La Mosquitia (Nicaragua), comprising the North and South Caribbean Coast Autonomous Regions
La Mosquitia (Honduras), largely within Gracias a Dios Department